Titanus is an Italian film production company.

Titanus may also refer to:

 Titanus giganteus, the titan beetle
 Dorcus titanus, the giant stag beetle
 Titanus the Carrierzord, a zord from Mighty Morphin Power Rangers
 Titanus (city), a city mentioned in the Iliad Catalogue of Ships
 Mount Titanus, a mountain near the ancient town of Asterium